Term MASP2 may refer to:

 Mannan-binding lectin-associated serine protease-2, an enzyme class
 MASP2 (protein), a human enzyme encoded by the MASP2 gene